On August 28, 2014, U.S. President Barack Obama held a live press conference on increasing the military response against the Islamic State (ISIS) in Syria  while wearing a tan suit. Obama's appearance on television in the tan suit sparked significant attention and led to media and social media criticism. The issue remained prominent in the media for several days with the issue being particularly widely discussed on talk shows.

Background 
On August 28, 2014, Obama held a press conference about the situation regarding ISIS in Syria, and how the US military was planning to respond to it. At the conference, Obama said that the U.S. had yet to develop a plan regarding the removal of ISIS, and talked extensively about his concerns in the region. During the conference he wore a tan suit, which up until that point was uncommon for Obama to do.

The light-colored suit was seen by conservative media outlet Fox News as inappropriate due to the gravitas of the subject matter. The controversy was seen in the context of the slow news season before the run-up to the 2014 election campaign. The suit received mixed reviews from a fashion perspective.

At the time, the unusual attention given to a male leader's fashion choices was contrasted with that of his 2008 Democratic rival Hillary Clinton's "regular experience" as a woman in politics.

Immediate response 
There was significant backlash from mainly conservative circles. Republican Representative Peter King of New York called Obama's wearing of the suit while talking about the economy instead of terrorism unpresidential, and stated that "There's no way, I don't think, any of us can excuse what the president did yesterday. I mean, you have the world watching." According to Justin Sink of The Hill, most people viewed Obama's fashion choice to be a mistake.

Conservative critics of Obama joked about the tan suit, making a play on words of Obama's "yes we can" and "the audacity of hope" phrases into "yes we tan" and "the audacity of taupe." The latter phrase, a take on the title of Obama's presidential campaign book, was recycled from media coverage of a 2010 Oval Office redecoration by Michael S. Smith which featured a prominent taupe rug and furnishings in similar muted colors, playfully criticized by Arianna Huffington among others.

Others defended Obama's tan suit. The day after the press conference, White House press secretary Josh Earnest said that Obama felt pretty good about his decision to wear the suit. Fashion designer Joseph Abboud, who had made suits for the president before, praised Obama for the decision, saying that "You don't want to look the same every day of your life. It's boring as hell." Multiple news outlets pointed out how presidents in the past had also worn tan suits, including Ronald Reagan and Bill Clinton. Still others said that the tan suit controversy was overshadowing the greater implications of the conference, and of the U.S. strategy for combating ISIS.

Legacy 
Ultimately, the controversy came to be seen as petty and trivial.  For Obama, the tan suit controversy became a topic to joke about at future events.

During the presidency of Donald Trump, the tan suit controversy was frequently referred to by Trump critics to draw a contrast between Obama and Trump. These critics contrasted the attention devoted to this trivial issue under the Obama administration with various examples of Trump's actions that broke more substantial political norms while generating less coverage, and argued that the episode illustrated how Obama's presidency was covered in comparison to Trump's.

During the week of Obama's 60th birthday, and near the seven-year anniversary of Obama's tan suit incident, President Joe Biden wore a tan suit for a press conference, which was widely reported as a jab at the initial controversy.

On September 7, 2022, at an event honoring Obama's official portraits unveiled at the White House, Barack Obama joked about the tan suit incident.

See also 
 Seersucker Thursday
 Jimmy Carter rabbit incident

References

External links 
 August 28, 2014, Statement by the President
 August 28, 2014, White House blog post by Tanya Somanader

Obama administration controversies
2014 controversies in the United States
Clothing controversies
Individual suits